Todd Snyder (born 6 January 1965) in Anchorage, Alaska, is a former racing driver and driving instructor. Snyder was placed second in the 1998 and 1999 Barber Dodge Pro Series seasons.

Career
Todd Snyder started his pro racing career at the Jim Russell Racing School. The driver from Alaska finished second in his second pro series season ever in the Formula Russell Pro Mazda. In 1988 Snyder made his debut in the Barber Saab Pro Series. At Sonoma Raceway he finished third behind Rob Wilson and Harald Huysman. In 1990 Todd Snyder joined the Skip Barber Racing School as a lead instructor at Lime Rock Park. In 1998 Snyder returned to the rebranded Barber Dodge Pro Series. After winning the opening round at Sebring International Raceway Snyder won two races at Mazda Raceway Laguna Seca. He finished runner-up in the championship, three points behind Jeff Simmons. In 1999 he returned in the series. After a poor start of the season the race instructor won four races. Again Snyder finished second in the championship, this time four points behind Simmons. Following his strong results Snyder tested an Indy Lights car for Conquest Racing and Brian Stewart Racing. He competed six races for Brian Stewart Racing in the 2000 Indy Lights season. Snyder also competed in the 2000 24 Hours of Daytona. In a Chevrolet Camaro entered by Diablo Racing the team finished third in the US GT class. He returned to the 24 Hours of Daytona  in 2001 and 2002 but without achieving any significant results.

He focused on his professional career becoming the vice president of competition at the Skip Barber Racing School in 2004. He also fulfilled the position of director of competition in the SCCA Mazda MX-5 Cup. Since 2013, he fulfills the function of race director for the Ferrari Challenge North America. He also was chief instructor at the Mid-Ohio Sports Car Course from 2012 to 2015. Snyder returned to racing 2010, 2011 and 2012 Continental Tire Sports Car Challenge seasons. 

In 2015, Snyder joined the Lucas Oil School of Racing as chief operating officer for the racing school and race series.

Motorsports results

Motorsports Career Results

American open–wheel racing results
(key) (Races in bold indicate pole position)

Barber Dodge Pro Series

Indy Lights

24 Hours of Daytona

12 Hours of Sebring

References

1968 births
Indy Lights drivers
Barber Pro Series drivers
24 Hours of Daytona drivers
12 Hours of Sebring drivers
Racing drivers from Alaska
Rolex Sports Car Series drivers
Sportspeople from Anchorage, Alaska
University of Alaska Anchorage alumni
Living people